Synanthedon xanthopyga is a moth of the family Sesiidae. It is known from western Africa.

References

Sesiidae
Moths described in 1905